The ATP Zaragoza was a men's tennis tournament played in Zaragoza, Spain played on indoor carpet courts.  The event was played as part of the ATP Tour in 1993 and 1994 at Pabellón Príncipe Felipe, following an indoor hard challenger at the same venue in 1992 (the challenger event had previously been held on clay at Real Zaragoza Club de Tenis since 1984).

Champions

Singles

Doubles

References

External links
 ATP World Tour archive

Indoor tennis tournaments
Defunct tennis tournaments in Spain
ATP Tour
Recurring sporting events established in 1993
Recurring events disestablished in 1994
Atp Zaragoza
Carpet court tennis tournaments